Dolno Orizari is a village in the municipality of Šuto Orizari, North Macedonia.

Demographics
According to the 2002 census, the village had a total of 1550 inhabitants. Ethnic groups in the village include:

Albanians  1389
Romani 110
Macedonians 37
Turks 6
Serbs 1 
Others 77

References

Villages in Šuto Orizari Municipality
Albanian communities in North Macedonia